Digital Audio Tape (DAT or R-DAT) is a signal recording and playback medium developed by Sony and introduced in 1987. In appearance it is similar to a Compact Cassette, using 3.81 mm / 0.15" (commonly referred to as 4 mm) magnetic tape enclosed in a protective shell, but is roughly half the size at 73 mm × 54 mm × 10.5 mm. The recording is digital rather than analog. DAT can record at sampling rates equal to, as well as higher and lower than a CD (44.1, 48, or 32 kHz sampling rate respectively) at 16 bits quantization. If a comparable digital source is copied without returning to the analogue domain, then the DAT will produce an exact clone, unlike other digital media such as Digital Compact Cassette or non-Hi-MD MiniDisc, both of which use a lossy data reduction system.

Like most formats of videocassette, a DAT cassette may only be recorded and played in one direction, unlike an analog compact audio cassette, although many DAT recorders had the capability to record program numbers and IDs, which can be used to select an individual track like on a CD player.

Although intended as a replacement for analog audio compact cassettes, the format was never widely adopted by consumers because of its expense, as well as concerns from the music industry about unauthorized high-quality copies. The format saw moderate success in professional markets and as a computer storage medium, which was developed into the Digital Data Storage format. As Sony has ceased production of new recorders, it will become more difficult to play archived recordings in this format unless they are copied to other formats or hard drives. Meanwhile, the phenomenon of sticky-shed syndrome has been noted by some engineers involved in re-mastering archival recordings on DAT, which presents a further threat to audio held exclusively in this medium.

History

Development 
The technology of DAT is closely based on video recorders, using a rotating head and helical scan to record data. This prevents DATs from being physically edited in the cut-and-splice manner of analog tapes, or open-reel digital tapes like ProDigi or DASH. In 1983, a DAT meeting was established to unify the standards for recording digital audio on magnetic tape developed by each company and in 1985, two standards were created: R-DAT (Rotating Digital Audio Tape) using a rotary head and S-DAT (Stationary Digital Audio Tape) using a fixed head. The S-DAT format had a simple mechanism similar to the Compact Cassette format but was difficult to develop a fixed recording head for high-density recording while the rotating head of the R-DAT had a proven track record in VCR formats like VHS & Betamax. While R-DAT would later be known as just "DAT", there would be an S-DAT media format that would be released later in the form of the Digital Compact Cassette. Sony would later introduce another R-DAT format in the form of NT which was meant to replace the Microcassette and Mini-Cassette.

The DAT standard allows for four sampling modes: 32 kHz at 12 bits, and 32 kHz, 44.1 kHz or 48 kHz at 16 bits. Certain recorders operate outside the specification, allowing recording at 96 kHz and 24 bits (HHS). Some early machines aimed at the consumer market did not operate at 44.1 kHz when recording so they could not be used to 'clone' a compact disc. Since each recording standard uses the same tape, the quality of the sampling has a direct relation to the duration of the recording – 32 kHz at 12 bits will allow six hours of recording onto a three-hour tape while HHS will only give 90 minutes from the same tape. Included in the signal data are subcodes to indicate the start and end of tracks or to skip a section entirely; this allows for indexing and fast seeking. Two-channel stereo recording is supported under all sampling rates and bit depths, but the R-DAT standard does support 4-channel recording at 32 kHz.

DATs are between 15 and 180 minutes in length, a 120-minute tape being 60 metres in length. DATs longer than 60 metres tend to be problematic in DAT recorders due to the thinner media. DAT machines running at 48 kHz and 44.1 kHz sample rates transport the tape at 8.15 mm/s. DAT machines running at 32 kHz sample rate transport the tape at 4.075 mm/s.

Predecessor formats 
DAT was not the first digital audio tape; pulse-code modulation (PCM) was used in Japan by Denon in 1972 for the mastering and production of analogue phonograph records, using a 2-inch Quadruplex-format videotape recorder for its transport, but this was not developed into a consumer product. Denon's development dated from its work with Japan's NHK Broadcasting; NHK developed the first high-fidelity PCM audio recorder in the late 1960s. Denon continued development of their PCM recorders that used professional video machines as the storage medium, eventually building 8-track units used for, among other productions, a series of jazz records made in New York in the late 1970s.

Soundstream's format was improved through several prototypes and when it was developed to 50 kHz sampling rate at 16 bits, it was deemed good enough for professional classical recording by the company's first client, Telarc Records of Cleveland, Ohio. Telarc's April, 1978 recording of the Holst Suites for Band by Frederick Fennell and the Cleveland Wind Ensemble was a landmark release, and ushered in digital recording for America's classical music labels. Soundstream's system was also used by RCA.

Starting in 1978, 3M introduced its own line and format of digital audio tape recorders for use in a recording studio. One of the first prototypes of 3M's system was installed in the studios of Sound 80 in Minneapolis, Minnesota. This system was used in June 1978 to record Aaron Copland's "Appalachian Spring" by the St. Paul Chamber Orchestra conducted by Dennis Russell Davies. That record was the first Grammy-winning digital recording. The production version of the 3M Digital Mastering System was used in 1979 to record the first all-digital rock album, Ry Cooder's "Bop Till You Drop," made at Warner Brothers Studio in California.

The first consumer-oriented PCM format used consumer video tape formats (Beta and VHS) as the storage medium. These systems used the EIAJ digital format, which sampled at 44.056 kHz at 14 bits. The Sony PCM-F1 system debuted in 1981, and Sony from the start offered the option of 16-bit wordlength. Other systems were marketed by Akai, JVC, Nakamichi and others. Panasonic, via its Technics division, briefly sold a digital recorder that combined an EIAJ digital adapter with a VHS video transport, the SV-P100. These machines were marketed by consumer electronics companies to consumers, but they were very pricey compared to cassette or even reel-to-reel decks of the time. They did catch on with the more budget conscious professional recordists, and some boutique-label professional releases were recorded using these machines.

Starting in the early 1980s, professional systems using a PCM adaptor were also common as mastering formats. These systems digitized an analog audio signal and then encoded the resulting digital stream into an analog video signal so that a conventional VCR could be used as a storage medium.

One of the most significant examples of a PCM adaptor-based system was the Sony PCM-1600 digital audio mastering system, introduced in 1978. The PCM-1600 used a U-Matic-format VCR for its transport, connected to external digital audio processing hardware. It (and its later versions such as the PCM-1610 and 1630) was widely used for the production and mastering of some of the first Digital Audio CDs in the early 1980s. Once CDs were commercially introduced in 1982, tapes recorded on the PCM-1600 were sent to the CD pressing plants to be used to make the glass master disc for CD replication.

Other examples include dbx, Inc.'s Model 700 system, which, similar to later Super Audio CDs, used a high sample-rate delta-sigma modulation rather than PCM; Decca's 1970s PCM system, which used a videotape recorder manufactured by IVC for a transport; and Mitsubishi's X-80 digital recorder, a 6.4 mm (¼ in) open reel digital mastering format that used a very unusual sampling rate of 50.4 kHz.

For high-quality studio recording, all of these formats were effectively made obsolete in the early 1980s by two competing reel-to-reel formats with stationary heads: Sony's DASH format and Mitsubishi's continuation of the X-80 recorder, which was improved upon to become the ProDigi format. (In fact, one of the first ProDigi-format recorders, the Mitsubishi X-86C, was playback-compatible with tapes recorded on an X-80.) Both of these formats remained popular as an analog alternative until the early 1990s, when hard disk recorders rendered them obsolete.

Demise 
Sony released its last DAT product with the DAT Walkman TCD-D100 in 1995 and continued to produce it until November 2005 when Sony announced that its remaining DAT machine models would be discontinued the following month. Sony had sold around 660,000 DAT products since its introduction in 1987. Sony continued to produce blank DAT tapes until 2015 when it announced it would cease production by the end of the year. Even with this, the DAT format still finds regular use in film and television recording, primarily due to the support in some recorders for SMPTE time code synchronisation, and sometimes by audio enthusiasts as a way of backing up vinyl, compact cassette and CD collections to a digital format to then be transferred to PC. Although it has been superseded by modern hard disk recording or memory card equipment, which offers much more flexibility and storage, Digital Data Storage tapes, which are broadly similar to DATs, apart from tape length and thickness on some variants, and are still manufactured today unlike DAT cassettes, are often used as substitutes in many situations.

Digital Compact Cassette 
The DAT recorder mechanism was considerably more complex and expensive than an analogue cassette deck mechanism due to the rotary helical scan head, therefore Philips and Panasonic Corporation developed a rival digital tape recorder system with a stationary head based on the analogue compact cassette known as S-DAT. The Digital Compact Cassette (DCC) was cheaper and simpler mechanically than DAT, but did not make perfect digital copies as it used a lossy compression technique called PASC. (Lossy compression was necessary to reduce the data rate to a level that the DCC head could record successfully at the linear tape speed of 4.75 cm/s that the compact cassette system uses.) DCC was never a competitor to DAT in recording studios, because DAT was already established, and studios favor lossless formats.  As DCC was launched at the same time as Sony's Minidisc format (which has random access and editing features), it was not successful with consumers either. However, DCC proved that high quality digital recording could be achieved with a cheap simple mechanism using stationary heads.

Anti-DAT lobbying 

In the late 1980s, the Recording Industry Association of America (RIAA) unsuccessfully lobbied against the introduction of DAT devices into the U.S. Initially, the organization threatened legal action against any manufacturer attempting to sell DAT machines in the country. It later sought to impose restrictions on DAT recorders to prevent them from being used to copy LPs, CDs, and prerecorded cassettes. One of these efforts, the Digital Audio Recorder Copycode Act of 1987 (introduced by Sen. Al Gore and Rep. Waxman), initiated by CBS Records president Walter Yetnikoff, involved a technology called CopyCode and required DAT machines to include a chip to detect attempts to copy material recorded with a notch filter, meaning that copyrighted prerecorded music, whether analog or digital, whether on LP, cassette, or DAT, would have distorted sound resulting from the notch filter applied by the publisher at the time of mastering for mass reproduction. A National Bureau of Standards study showed that not only were the effects plainly audible, but that it was not even effective at preventing copying.

This opposition by CBS softened after Sony, a DAT manufacturer, bought CBS Records in January 1988. By June 1989, an agreement was reached, and the only concession the RIAA would receive was a more practical recommendation from manufacturers to Congress that legislation be enacted to require that recorders have a Serial Copy Management System to prevent digital copying for more than a single generation. This requirement was enacted as part of the Audio Home Recording Act of 1992, which also imposed taxes on DAT recorders and blank media. However, the computer industry successfully lobbied to have personal computers exempted from that act, setting the stage for massive consumer copying of copyrighted material on materials like recordable CDs and by extension, filesharing systems such as Napster.

Uses

Professional recording industry 
DAT was used professionally in the 1990s by the audio recording industry as part of an emerging all-digital production chain also including digital multi-track recorders and digital mixing consoles that was used to create a fully digital recording. In this configuration, it is possible for the audio to remain digital from the first AD converter after the mic preamp until it is in a CD player.

Pre-recorded albums 

 
In December 1987, The Guitar And Other Machines by the British post-punk band The Durutti Column, became the first commercial release on DAT. Later in May 1988, Wire released their album The Ideal Copy on the format. Several other albums from multiple record labels were also released as pre-recorded DATs in the first few years of the format's existence, in small quantities as well. Factory Records released a small number of albums on the format, including New Order's best-selling compilation Substance 1987, but many planned releases were cancelled.

Amateur and home use 

DAT was envisaged by proponents as the successor format to analogue audio cassettes in the way that the compact disc was the successor to vinyl-based recordings. It sold well in Japan, where high-end consumer audio stores stocked DAT recorders and tapes into the 2010s and second-hand stores generally continued to offer a wide selection of mint condition machines. However, there and in other nations, the technology was never as commercially popular as CD or cassette. DAT recorders proved to be comparatively expensive and few commercial recordings were available. Globally, DAT remained popular, for a time, for making and trading recordings of live music (see bootleg recording), since available DAT recorders predated affordable CD recorders. In the 1990s, fans of jam bands, such as the Grateful Dead and Phish, recorded and stored high-quality audience recordings of live concerts on the format.

Computer data storage medium 

The format was designed for audio use, but through the ISO Digital Data Storage standard was adopted for general data storage, storing from 1.3 to 80 GB on a 60 to 180 meter tape depending on the standard and compression. It is a sequential-access medium and is commonly used for backups. Due to the higher requirements for capacity and integrity in data backups, a computer-grade DAT was introduced, called DDS (Digital Data Storage). Although functionally similar to audio DATs, only a few DDS and DAT drives (in particular, those manufactured by Archive for SGI workstations) are capable of reading the audio data from a DAT cassette. SGI DDS4 drives no longer have audio support; SGI removed the feature due to "lack of demand".

See also 
 ADAT
 Digital Audio Stationary Head
 Digital Data Storage (DDS)
 Digital Compact Cassette
 Magnetic storage
 Magnetic tape
 Magnetic tape sound recording
 MiniDisc
 NT (cassette)
 PCM adaptor
 ProDigi

References

External links 

Audio storage
Digital audio
Japanese inventions
Portable audio players
Products introduced in 1987
Sony products
Tape recording